Joshua Vanneck, 1st Baron Huntingfield (31 December 1745 – 15 August 1816), known as Sir Joshua Vanneck, 3rd Baronet, from 1791 to 1796, was a British merchant and Member of Parliament.

Huntingfield was the second son of the London merchant Sir Joshua Vanneck, 1st Baronet, and Mary Anne Daubuz. The family was of Dutch origin. He was educated at Eton and then became a merchant in London like his father.

In 1774 Alexander Fordyce was forced to sell his splendid estate in Roehampton to Joshua Vanneck. After 1777 Grove House, Roehampton was rebuilt by James Wyatt and Robert Adam.

In 1790 he succeeded his elder brother as Member of Parliament for Dunwich, a seat he held until 1816, and in 1791 he also succeeded him as third Baronet, inheriting Heveningham Hall in Suffolk. In 1796 he was raised to the Peerage of Ireland as Baron Huntingfield, of Heveningham Hall in the County of Suffolk.

Lord Huntingfield married Maria Thompson, daughter of Andrew Thompson, in 1777. He died in August 1816, aged 70, and was succeeded in his titles by his eldest son Joshua.

References

Kidd, Charles, Williamson, David (editors). Debrett's Peerage and Baronetage (1990 edition). New York: St Martin's Press, 1990.

www.thepeerage.com

External links 
 

1745 births
1816 deaths
People educated at Eton College
Barons in the Peerage of Ireland
Peers of Ireland created by George III
Members of the Parliament of Great Britain for English constituencies
British MPs 1790–1796
British MPs 1796–1800
Members of the Parliament of the United Kingdom for English constituencies
UK MPs 1801–1802
UK MPs 1802–1806
UK MPs 1806–1807
UK MPs 1807–1812
UK MPs 1812–1818
Joshua